UMN may refer to:
 Makyan language, a Tibeto-Burman of Burma
 Multimedia Nusantara University (Universitas Multimedia Nusantara)
 United Mission to Nepal
 University of Minnesota 
 UMN MapServer by the Open Source Geospatial Foundation
 Upper motor neuron
 Uspekhi Matematicheskikh Nauk, a journal translated into English as Russian Mathematical Surveys